The Battle of Shelon was a decisive battle between the forces of the Grand Duchy of Moscow under Ivan III (r. 1462–1505) and the army of the Novgorod Republic, which took place on the Shelon River on 14 July 1471. Novgorod suffered a major defeat and ended with the de facto unconditional surrender of the city. Novgorod was absorbed by Muscovy in 1478.

Background 
The clash between the Muscovy and the Novgorod Republic was a continuation of the conflict between them going back into the late 14th century. This particular episode was caused by Novgorod's violation of the Treaty of Yazhelbitsy (1456) signed between Grand Prince Vasily II and the Novgorodian delegation headed by Archbishop Evfimy II. In particular, the treaty limited Novgorod's ability to conduct its own foreign affairs and gave the Grand Prince of Moscow more control over the city (he controlled the city's seals and became the court of higher instance for the Novgorodian courts). When the Novgorodians turned to Poland–Lithuania for help in limiting Moscow's growing power, Ivan III and the metropolitan accused them not only of political treachery, but of attempting to abandon Eastern Orthodoxy and go over to the Catholic Church. A draft treaty between Novgorod and the Grand Duke of Lithuania and King of Poland, Casimir IV Jagiellon (r. 1440–1492), said to have been found in a cache of documents after the battle of Shelon, made it clear that the Lithuanian Grand Prince was not to interfere with the election of the archbishop of Novgorod or the Orthodox faith in the city (by building Catholic churches in the city for example.)

The Battle 
The battle took place in the morning of 14 July on the left bank of the Shelon River, which flows into Lake Ilmen southwest of Novgorod. It is believed to have taken place about 30 km from the mouth of the river and just to the east of the town of Soltsy, possibly, near the village of Skirino. The location indicates that the Muscovite army was advancing on Novgorod along the western shore of the lake to come up on the city from the southwest. After an accidental encounter of the Muscovite forces (around 5,000 men) under the command of Prince Daniel Kholmsky (Daniel of Kholm) with the army of Novgorod (20,000 to 40,000 men), the badly organized army of Novgorod was not able to withstand the pressure of the princely forces. Indeed, the Novgorodian Fourth Chronicle reports that Feofil, Archbishop-Elect of Novgorod, ordered his cavalry to not attack the Muscovites, but only the Pskovian forces, thus limiting their room to maneuver. The Battle of Shelon lasted for two hours and ended with Novgorod's defeat. According to Muscovite sources, more than 12,000 Novgorodians were killed during the battle and the subsequent pursuit. Some 2,000 men were taken prisoners. It is, however, difficult to say how accurate these figures are as the size of the Novgorodian army at this time are almost impossible to determine, and the number seems quite high given that the city of Novgorod itself probably had a population of only about 40,000 people, although the army could have been drawn from the rural population as well. That being said, the numbers may have been inflated to add to the Grand Prince's prestige and cast Novgorod in an even worse light.

Aftermath 
On 24 July Ivan III executed the Novgorodian commander, Dmitry Isaakovich Boretsky, one of the Boretsky clan which, led by Marfa Boretskaya, had championed the city's opposition to Moscow. In the longer term, the defeat at Shelon severely weakened the Novgorodian Republic. According to some sources, Ivan III confiscated significant amounts of land from the archiepiscopal administration and several of the largest monasteries immediately after the battle (although most sources date these confiscations to 1478), thus weakening the independence of the Novgorodian church. He also returned to the city several times in the 1470s and arrested important boyars or entire boyar clans. However, he only took direct control of the city-state in January 1478 after further strained relations with Archbishop Feofil and Novgorodian boyars led him to send his armies against the city in the winter of 1477–1478.

References

External links 
 A Russian description of the battle

1471 in Europe
Shelon
15th century in the Grand Duchy of Moscow
Shelon
Shelon
15th-century military history of Russia